Michael George Vickers (born April 27, 1953) is an American defense official who served as the Under Secretary of Defense for Intelligence (USD-I). As USD-I, Vickers, who was appointed by President Barack Obama in 2010, was the Defense Department's top civilian military intelligence official. Before becoming USD-I, Vickers served as Assistant Secretary of Defense for Special Operations and Low Intensity Conflict.

Before joining the Defense Department, Vickers served in the Army Special Forces as both a non-commissioned officer and commissioned officer, as well as a Central Intelligence Agency (CIA) paramilitary operations officer from their elite Special Activities Division. While in the CIA, he played a key role in the arming of the resistance to the Soviet invasion of Afghanistan.

Career
Vickers was born in Burbank, California. From 1973 to 1978 Vickers served as an Army Special Forces sergeant with the 10th Special Forces Group at Fort Devens, Massachusetts and 1st Battalion, Special Forces Detachment Europe (Airborne) in Bad Tölz, Germany.
In 1978 Vickers became a commissioned officer serving with the 7th Special Forces Group at Fort Gulick, Panama.
In June 1983 Vickers resigned from military service and later joined the CIA's Special Activities Division as a paramilitary operations officer.

In the mid-1980s, Vickers became involved with Operation Cyclone, the CIA program to arm Islamist Mujahideen during the Soviet–Afghan War. He was the head military strategist for the US, coordinating an effort that involved ten countries and providing direction to forces made up of over 500,000 Afghan fighters.

Later he was Senior Vice President, Strategic Studies, at the Center for Strategic and Budgetary Assessments (CSBA), during which he provided advice on Iraq strategy to US President George H. W. Bush and his war cabinet.

In 2004, he wrote an op-ed piece for USA Today in which he stated that the United States could be successful in Iraq by using a much smaller force modeled on its deployment in Afghanistan.

In July 2007, he was confirmed by the United States Senate as Assistant Secretary of Defense, where he was the senior civilian advisor to the US Secretary of Defense on such matters as "counter-terrorism" strategy and operational employment of special operations forces, strategic forces, and conventional forces.

Regarding ISIS and Al-Qaeda, Vickers has advocated a policy of disruption, of raids intended to distract and keep militants off-balance such that they are unable to organize and execute action against the United States and its forces in Afghanistan, Iraq, and the Middle East.

He retired from government service in April 2015. As of December 2015, it was announced that he had been appointed to the BAE Systems board of directors.

In 2020, Vickers, along with over 130 other former Republican national security officials, signed a statement that asserted that President Trump was unfit to serve another term, and "To that end, we are firmly convinced that it is in the best interest of our nation that Vice President Joe Biden be elected as the next President of the United States, and we will vote for him."

In October 2020, Vickers signed a letter that stated the Biden laptop story “has the classic earmarks of a Russian information operation".

Personal life

He decided to instead enlist in the U.S. Army, applying for service in Special Forces, figuring that they would best prepare him for his ideal occupation in the Central Intelligence Agency. When he took the Army's intelligence test, he received a score of 160 points, the highest score possible. He excelled at virtually every aspect of Special Forces training. He was considered one of their foremost experts in hand-to-hand combat, and he studied Soviet weapons and tactics to an obsessive level. He cross-trained with the Navy SEALs and the British SAS, and even volunteered to parachute behind Soviet lines with a small thermonuclear warhead, should a large scale war break out. He also completed the Army's grueling Ranger School as well as the elite Military Freefall Parachutist School.

Later in life, Vickers attended the University of Alabama, where he graduated with honors, and went on to attend the Wharton Business School at the University of Pennsylvania from which he received an MBA. He earned a Ph.D. in 2011 in International Relations/Strategic Studies from the Paul H. Nitze School of Advanced International Studies (SAIS) at Johns Hopkins University under Professor Eliot A. Cohen.

In popular culture

Vickers' role at the Central Intelligence Agency during the Soviet–Afghan War was featured in George Crile's 2003 book Charlie Wilson's War, and in the 2007 movie adaptation in which he is played by actor Christopher Denham.

See also
 Charlie Wilson (Texas politician)
 Gust Avrakotos
 Howard Hart

References

External links
 
 SOF Advisor - Michael G. Vickers November 14, 2007
 U.S. adapts Cold-War Idea to Fight Terrorists NY Times March 18, 2008

|-

1953 births
American military writers
Center for Strategic and Budgetary Assessments
Counterinsurgency theorists
Counterterrorism theorists
George W. Bush administration personnel
Guerrilla warfare theorists
Living people
Members of the United States Army Special Forces
Obama administration personnel
Paul H. Nitze School of Advanced International Studies alumni
People from Burbank, California
People of the Central Intelligence Agency
People of the Soviet–Afghan War
Psychological warfare theorists
Terrorism theorists
United States Army officers
United States Assistant Secretaries of Defense
United States Under Secretaries of Defense
University of Alabama alumni
Wharton School of the University of Pennsylvania alumni